Lough Guitane is a freshwater lake in the southwest of Ireland. It is located in County Kerry near the town of Killarney.

Geography

Geology 
Lough Guitane is the site and namesake of a volcanic complex of tuffs and rhyolites, of which the centres are at Bennaunmore, Horses Glen and Kileen.

Natural history
Fish species in Lough Guitane include brown trout, mainly of the freshwater variety with a smaller seasonal number of the sea variety.

See also
List of loughs in Ireland

References

Guitane
Volcanism of the Republic of Ireland